Dormans is a commune located in the Marne department and in the Grand Est region of France.

Geography 
Dormans is located in the valley of the Marne, at the border between the departments of the Marne and the Aisne, some 40 km from Reims and 25 km from Chateau-Thierry. The RN 3 goes through Dormans and leads to the autoroute A4. Dormans has a train station on the Paris–Strasbourg railway that sees multiple SNCF trains daily.

Dormans is at the heart of the Champagne vineyards.

Villages under jurisdiction of Dormans 
The commune of Dormans regroups several small villages: Champaillet, Chavenay, Soilly, Try, Sainte-Croix, Vassieux and Vassy.

Soilly used to be its own commune but was integrated to Dormans in 1969.

Politics and administration 

The commune is located in the arrondissement of Épernay, in the department of the Marne.

Dormans is twinned with Dorsten, Germany, since 1981.

Population

Gallery

See also
Communes of the Marne department

References

Further reading 
 Dom Albert Noël, Dormans (Notice historique sur le canton), Le Livre d'Histoire – Lorisse, 1877, 

Communes of Marne (department)